Egypt is classified as having a “high power system size (24,700 MW installed generation capacity in 2010 with more than 40 grid-connected plants).” As of 2010, 100% of the Egyptian population has access to electricity.

History
When electricity was first introduced in Egypt in 1893, the generation and distribution of electricity was practiced exclusively by private companies. In 1962, the generation, transmission, and distribution of electricity were nationalized under three authorities (the Electricity Production Authority, the Electricity Distribution Authority, and the Electricity Projects Implementation Authority) leaving the government as the sole owner and operator of all electrical companies. These three authorities were replaced in 1965 by the public Egyptian Corporation for Electricity which remained active until 1976 when it was converted into the Egypt Electricity Authority as decreed by electricity sector Law no. 12. In 1978 the Egypt Electricity Authority supervised the establishment of seven geographically divided electricity distribution companies. An additional electrical power distribution authority was established in 1983 as a means of supervising distribution companies which had become independent of the Egypt Electricity Authority.

Between 1996 and 2000 a series of laws and presidential decrees were passed to reorganize and regulate the growing electrical industry.
1996: Electricity sector Law no. 100 was issued, opening up the industry by allowing for the construction, operation, and maintenance of electric generation stations by both local and foreign investors.
1997: The Electric Utility and Consumer Protection Regulatory Agency was established under presidential decree no. 326 to regulate, supervise, and monitor the relation between the associated electric utility parties.
1998: Electricity sector Law no. 18 was issued declaring that all generation stations and the high voltage network were to be affiliated to the distribution companies which, in turn, were to be affiliated to the Egyptian Electricity Authority rather than the business sector.
2000: presidential decree no. 339 and electricity sector Law no. 164 were issued. Presidential decree no. 339 reorganized the Electric Utility and Consumer Protection Regulatory Agency while electricity sector Law no. 164 enacted the conversion of The Egyptian Electricity Authority to a contribution company called the Egyptian Electric Holding Company (EEHC).

Between 2000 and 2001, the EEHC implemented a division in the organization of Egypt's electrical management framework. Generation (production) activity was separated from distribution activity along with the separation of control and transmission between ultra-high-voltage and high-voltage networks. This division rearranged the industry to consist of 13 companies: one company for electricity transmission, one company for hydroelectric power production, four companies for thermal power production, and seven companies for electricity distribution. In 2002 the Delta Company for electricity distribution divided into North Delta and South Delta increasing the number of companies to 14. In 2004 the Cairo company for electricity distribution divided into North Cairo and South Cairo in addition to the Delta company for electricity production dividing into three companies: East Delta, Middle Delta and West Delta.

Currently, there are 16 companies affiliated with the EEHC that make up the Egyptian electric utility system.
The production companies are made up of Cairo, East Delta, Middle Delta, West Delta, Upper Egypt, and Hydro Plants Electricity Production Companies.
Transmission company: Egyptian Electricity Transmission Company.
Distribution companies: North Cairo, South Cairo, Alexandria, Canal, North Delta, South Delta, El- Behera, Middle Egypt, and Upper Egypt Electricity Distribution Companies.

Power system issues
Since the early 2000s, power outage rates and durations, as well as distribution system losses, have trended downwards indicating that distribution companies have improved their overall customer service quality over the past decade; however, Egypt has seen a great weakening in its supply security. The power system's generation reserve capacity declined from 20% in the early 2000s to 10% by the 2010s. The Egyptian power system is now significantly less able to avoid power shortages during annual peak demand periods, which are typically the afternoons on the hottest days of the year.

The weakening of Egypt's supply security has caused widespread social issues in the 2010s. To deal with the extremely high demand for electricity, rolling blackouts and power cuts were implemented throughout the summer of 2012 causing great tension between the government and the people of Egypt. Angry residents from many villages protested the rolling blackouts by threatening to not pay their electricity bills and to sue their electricity provider. A campaign entitled “We Will Not Pay” was organized to encourage people to not pay their bills until the electrical service was stable once again. Residents from the Bardeen village in Zagazig also protested the unstable supply of electricity by blocking the Belbeis-Zagazig road. The government released statements encouraging people to ration their electricity consumption and announced that work was being done to generate an additional 1800 MW of power. Minister of Petroleum Abdullah Ghorab reiterated the importance of conserving electricity to avoid a state implemented policy of load shedding.

See also
Energy in Egypt
Renewable energy in Egypt
List of power stations in Egypt

References

Industry in Egypt
Electric power in Egypt